Ha Gil-jong (April 13, 1941 - February 28, 1979) was a South Korean film director, screenwriter and translator. Most famous for his youth classic, The March of Fools (1975), Ha was also a very prominent social critic in his day.

Biography
He was born as the seventh child of a family with nine children in Choryang-dong, Busan, South Korea. His little brother Hah Myung-joong is an actor and film director. Ha lost his mother in 1945 and his father in 1950 when the Korean War occurred. Orphaned, Ha came to live with relatives. In 1956 he went to Seoul with one of his older brothers, and attended Jungdong High School (중동고등학교) in the following year. He befriended Kim Chi-Ha there who later became a famous activist poet.

In 1960, while Ha studied French literature at Seoul National University, he met Kim Seung-ok (김승옥, novelist), Kim Hyun (김현, literature critic), Kim Chi-su (김치수, poet and critic), Lee Cheong-jun(novelist), Yeom Mu-yung (염무웅, literature critic) and Kim Ju-yeon (김주연, literature critic and  scholar of German] literature). After graduation, he briefly worked for Shin Film, Ha went to the United States in 1965 to study. Ha studied fine art and photography at San Francisco Academy of Art and entered UCLA graduation school where he acquired both a MA and MFA degree. During the time, he made several short films, and one of which is The Ritual for a Soldier. With the film, he won a Mayer Grant awarded by MGM.

Ha died of a stroke in 1979, aged 37.

Filmography
Byung-tae and Young-ja (병태와 영자 Byeongtae-wa Yeongja) (1979)
The Home of Stars 2 (별들의 고향 2 Byeoldeul-ui gohyang 2) (1978)
The Ascension of Han-ne (한네의 승천 Hanne-ui seungcheon) (1977)
I Am Looking For A Wife (여자를 찾습니다 Yeojaleul chajseubnida) (1976)
The March of Fools (바보들의 행진 Babodeul-ui haengjin) (1975)
Fidelity  (수절 Sujeol) (1973)
The Pollen of Flowers (화분 Hwabun) (1972)
The Ritual for a Soldier (병사의 제전 1969)

Awards and nominations
1979, the 15th Baeksang Arts Awards

See also 
List of Korean film directors
Cinema of Korea

References

External links 
 
 
 

1941 births
People from Busan
Seoul National University alumni
South Korean film directors
1979 deaths